Khrystyna (Tina) Yaroshenko (born May 18, 1985) is a Ukrainian film producer, editor, and director in New York City. She is a member of the Alliance of Women Directors and the New York Women in Film & Television.

Early life 
Yaroshenko was born on May 18, 1985 in Kherson, Ukraine. At a young age, her father was her main influence in developing an interest in film. At the age of 12, she began working to save money for film school. She moved to Kyiv, Ukraine to study at Kyiv National I. K. Karpenko-Kary Theatre, Cinema and Television University where she earned a master's degree with honors in Film and Television.

Film career 

Ukraine

Yaroshenko started her career in Ukraine by creating a 10 part documentary series called "My Truth". In 2005, she won "Best Full Length Script" for her screenplay Born in Fire by Koronatsiya Slova (Коронація слова), an international literacy competition of novels, screenplays, and plays. She later took on a role as Director of Video Production on Miss Universe Ukraine.

United States

Shortly after moving to the United States in 2014, Yaroshenko won "Best Short Film" at the International New Jersey Film Festival for her short Some Others. In 2016, she took on the role of lead editor in a PBS television series titled Start Up, a docuseries started by multimedia entrepreneur Gary Bredow. Yaroshenko's latest work involved being lead editor in a short film titled Warrior, which released in June 2019.

Filmography

Awards and honors 

 "Best Short Film" at the International New Jersey Film Festival Spring 2014 for her short Some Others.
 "Best Script of the Year" by Inter-Channel in Ukraine in 2007 for "TV Fishka".
 "Best Full Length Script" by Koronatsiya Slova (Коронація слова) in 2005 for her screenplay "Born in Fire".

References 

1985 births
Living people
Ukrainian film directors
Ukrainian women film directors